Duszniki  is a village in Szamotuły County, Greater Poland Voivodeship, in west-central Poland. It is the seat of the gmina (administrative district) called Gmina Duszniki.

The village has a population of 2,100.

Notable people
 Piotr Lisek, Polish pole vaulter

References

Villages in Szamotuły County